William Henry Clayton (17 November 1823 – 23 August 1877) was a Tasmanian-born colonial architect who practised initially in Tasmania and then in New Zealand.  He was New Zealand's first (and only) Colonial Architect, serving in the position from 1869 up until his death. In this role, he and his office were responsible for the design of numerous government buildings.

Early life and education
William was born on 17 November 1823, at Norfolk Plains, Australia. William's grandfather (who bore the same name) had been sentenced in 1802 to transportation for seven years to Australia for the possession of a purportedly stolen sheepskin. His wife Sarah and three-year-old Henry accompanied him on the convict ship Glatton which reached New South Wales in 1803.

At the age of 16 Henry received a land grant in Tasmania, which enabled him to become a prosperous businessman by the time his son William was born. As well as land holdings, by the 1840s  Henry also owned several flour mills and owned or chartered ships which he used to export flour from his mills to New Zealand and bring back cargo.

William was educated at the local exclusive Longford Hall Academy, where he won prizes in geography, French, Latin and mathematics. As Henry Clayton wanted his son to have the benefits of higher education, the family moved to England, departing on 28 March 1840 on the Adelaide. William furthered his education by being articled to a prominent architect, and received training in architecture, civil engineering and surveying.

Following his marriage in 1847 in England, Clayton and his wife Emily departed for Tasmania, arriving on 7 March 1848.

Tasmania
Upon his return to Tasmania Clayton worked in the Government Survey Office from 1851 to 1855 before setting up in private practice in Launceston. Clayton is credited with the design of some 300 structures in Tasmania, including five churches (among them Launceston's St Andrew's Kirk 1850, St Mark's, Deloraine 1860, and Chalmers Church, Launceston 1860), three banks, a theatre, three mills, breweries, mansions, villas, five bridges, and the  Launceston Mechanics' Institute (1842).

The Public Building in Launceston (1860), which was constructed of brick with richly-modelled  freestone dressings and Italianate classical in style, was the most ambitious and lavish of his secular works.

Clayton was a member of the Royal Victorian Institute of Architects, Melbourne, served as a Launceston Alderman from 1857 to 1863, and was appointed a justice of the peace in 1858.

New Zealand career
Attracted by the gold rushes which had brought new prosperity to Dunedin, Clayton emigrated to New Zealand on the Omeo arriving in Dunedin on 29 April 1863. His wife and six children followed soon after. Initially he practiced on his own account before entering into a partnership in 1864 with existing well-established architect William Mason, practicing under the name of Mason and Clayton. Over the next six years Clayton designed 84 buildings. Among the most prominent buildings were the Oamaru Post Office (1864), the Colonial Museum (1864) in Wellington, All Saints' Church, Dunedin (1865) and Edinburgh House (1865) in Dunedin. Following his election as the first mayor of Dunedin in 1865 Mason reduced his involvement in the practice.

Clayton's first involvement with Wellington was when Mason & Clayton received the commission to design the Colonial Museum. Subsequently, the partnership received the commission in 1865 to design Government House in Wellington. While Mason was involved in the selection of the site it was Clayton who eventually took the lead role with his design being preferred by the Premier, Frederick Weld.  However, its construction was postponed when the government was unable to obtain the site that had been chosen for the building. By the late 1860s the gold boom was over in Otago and with work in Dunedin declining Mason and Clayton dissolved their partnership in 1868. While the economy was stagnant there was a large unfulfilled requirement throughout the country for public buildings.   Looking around for work, Clayton proposed to the Colonial Secretary in October 1868 that he complete the design and call tenderers for Government House. His offer was accepted. Following delivery of his plans in January 1969 he was hired on 16 February of that same year to supervise construction of the building.

Colonial architect
In April 1869 agreement was reached for Clayton to take up the post of Colonial Architect and Superintendent of Public Works, reporting to the Colonial Secretary, E. W. Stafford. Based in Wellington, his office was to be called the Colonial Architect's Department. He was to be paid  £200 a year to cover all works or contracts up to £200 and a commission of 2.5% on contracts exceeding that amount, with the right to maintain a private practice. Following his appointment, Clayton wound up his affairs in Dunedin and together with his family departed from Dunedin for Wellington on 12 May 1869 on board the Airedale.

It was initially envisaged that Clayton's office would be responsible for the design of all new government buildings and overseeing their construction as well as making additions and repairs to existing buildings but later some building-types were later excluded, such as lighthouses, defence structures and railway stations.  Generally, he was responsible for Auckland and Wellington government houses, parliament buildings, court houses, customs houses, departmental offices, prisons, police stations, post offices, as well as maintenance of public domains.  Clayton's appointment coincided with the start of the extensive public work schemes of his son-in-law Julius Vogel who became colonial treasurer in June 1969 and was Premier from 1873 to 1875. These projects, on top of the existing backlog, created a large workload for Clayton who began working with people only appointed for only short periods to support him in line with fluctuating work demands. To assist in the quick design and construction of smaller public buildings Clayton developed standard designs featuring timber construction, steep roofs with deeply overhanging gables and standard windows.

In his first financial year (1869–70) in the role Clayton reported he earned £1,161.11.0. In 1871 the government forced him to agree to a salary of £700 though Clayton insisted on claiming the right to maintain a private practice (due to his concerns about the insecurity of his position). On one occasion he threatened to resign when he received criticism over it.  It wasn't until 1876 that he finally relinquished the right to engage in private practice.

In October 1873 Clayton's office was transferred at his urging to the newly established Public Works Department as its Colonial Architect's Branch, with Clayton reporting to the Engineer-in-Chief of the department. The transfer of his office allowed Clayton to appoint his first permanent 'core' staff. Among the appointments were William Beatson (1807–70) and Pierre Finch Martineau Burrows (1842-1920). Following his move to Wellington Clayton designed a house on Hobson Street which, when it was finished in 1874, was the first concrete house in New Zealand and the first house to have hot and cold running water. In carrying out his duties Clayton travelled widely, visiting Auckland, Tauranga, Gisborne, Napier and Nelson in 1875, and undertaking a major tour of the South Island in 1876.
 
During Clayton's period as Colonial Architect he designed and saw to completion 180 buildings, with 80 of them being post and telegraph offices.  He designed many public buildings in Wellington, including the old Government House and Parliament buildings, but he is best known for designing the Old Government Buildings in Wellington, then part of the New Zealand Parliament Buildings and the second-largest wooden building in the world (behind Tōdai-ji in Nara, Japan). An important design in Christchurch is the Chief Post Office in Cathedral Square, a Category I heritage building.

Death

In 1877 Clayton travelled south to Christchurch and Dunedin to value the buildings of the former old provincial councils. While in Dunedin an old ankle injury gave trouble and an abscess developed which became so infected that Dr Thomas Hocken who was attending him, strongly advised amputation. Seven days after his foot was amputated Clayton died of exhaustion at 4am on 23 August 1877.

He was buried in block 116 plot 12 in Dunedin's Northern cemetery the following day.  His wife who was in England visiting their daughter Mary Vogel at the time of his death returned to New Zealand to settle her husband's estate and then returned to London where she spent the rest of her life. Following Clayton's death, his chief draughtsman Pierre Finch Martineau Burrows took over running of the office, though he was never appointed to the position of Colonial Architect.

Personal life
Clayton married Emily Mary Samson on 7 October 1847 in Clapham, Surrey. William and Mary had the following children:
 Mary “Polly” Clayton (18 February 1849 - 12 August 1933). On 19 March 1867 she married her parents' neighbour Julius Vogel.
 Frances Clayton (born in about 1852). Married Montagu Charles Lamb Pym in 1875.
 George Clayton (1853- ). 
 William Henry Clayton (17 July 1857- ).
 Kate Emily Clayton (27 January 1860- ). Married Alfred Nathan.
 Leonard Clayton (1862- ).
 Herbert Mason Clayton (5 December 1864- ). Born in Dunedin.

Memorials
The William Clayton Building at 133 Molesworth Street in Wellington was originally named after him. Designed by the Government Architect for the Government Office Accommodation Board, it opened in 1983. It has subsequently been renamed.

Works
Among the buildings which Clayton personally designed, collaborated on or supervised the design of are:

References

Further reading

External links
 
 Clayton William.

1823 births
1877 deaths
People from Tasmania
New Zealand public servants
19th-century New Zealand architects
Burials at Dunedin Northern Cemetery